Public Opinion is a book by Walter Lippmann published in 1922. It is a critical assessment of functional democratic government, especially of the irrational and often self-serving social perceptions that influence individual behavior and prevent optimal societal cohesion. The detailed descriptions of the cognitive limitations people face in comprehending their sociopolitical and cultural environments, leading them to apply an evolving catalogue of general stereotypes to a complex reality, rendered Public Opinion a seminal text in the fields of media studies, political science, and social psychology.

Pseudo-environment
The introduction describes the human inability to interpret the world: "The real environment is altogether too big, too complex, and too fleeting for direct acquaintance" between people and their environment. Instead, people construct a pseudo-environment that is a subjective, biased, and necessarily abridged mental image of the world, and to a degree, everyone's pseudo-environment is a fiction. People "live in the same world, but they think and feel in different ones."

Human behavior is stimulated by the person's pseudo-environment and then is acted upon in the real world. The book highlights some general implications of the interactions among one's psychology, environment, and the mass communications media.

More recent research uses the term "social constructionism" or "constructed reality" to describe what Lippmann (1922) called "pseudo-environment".

News and truth
By definition, pertinent facts are never provided completely and accurately; by necessity they are arranged to portray a certain, subjective interpretation of an event. Those who are most familiar with the greatest number of facts about a certain environment construct a pseudo-environment that aligns with their own 'stereotypes' and convey this to the public, knowingly or not, to suit their own private needs. This is inescapable human nature. Propaganda inherently requires a barrier of censorship between the event and the public. Thus mass communication media, by their nature as vehicles for informational transmission, are essentially vulnerable to manipulation.

The blame for that perceptual parallax falls not upon the mass media technology (print, radio, cinema, or, inferentially, television) or logistical concerns, but upon certain members of society who attend to life with little intellectual engagement. That causes the following:

The buying public: the "bewildered herd" (a term here borrowed from The Phantom Public) must pay for understanding the unseen environment by the mass communications media. The irony is that although the public's opinion is important, it must pay for its acceptance. People will be selective and will buy the most factual media at the lowest price: "For a dollar, you may not even get an armful of candy, but for a dollar or less people expect reality/representations of truth to fall into their laps." The media have the social function of transmitting public affairs information and their business profit role of surviving in the market.
Nature of news: people publish already-confirmed news that are thus less disputable. Officially-available public matters will constitute "the news" and unofficial (private) matters are unavailable, are less available, or are used as "issues" for propaganda.
News truth and conclusion: the function of news is to signal an event, and that signalling, eventually, is a consequence of editorial selection and judgement; journalism creates and sows the seeds (news) that establish public opinion.

Manufacture of consent

Lippman argues that, when properly deployed in the public interest, the manufacture of consent is useful and necessary for a democratic society, because, in many cases, "the common interests" of the public are not obvious except upon careful analysis of the collected data, a critical intellectual exercise in which most people are uninterested or are incapable of doing. 

The political elite are members of the class of people who are incapable of accurately understanding, by themselves, the complex "unseen environment" wherein the public affairs of the modern state occur; thus, Lippmann proposes that a professional, "specialized class" collect and analyze data, and present their conclusions to the society's decision makers, who, in their turn, use the "art of persuasion" to inform the public about the decisions and circumstances affecting them.

The Public and Its Problems, a 1927 book by John Dewey, agreed that the general public is irrational, but rejected Lippman's call for a technocratic elite. Dewey believed that in a democracy, the people are also part of the public discourse. These contrasting opinions were discussed in the Lippman-Dewey Debate, which started to be widely discussed by the late 1980s in American communication studies circles.

Lippmann also figured prominently in work by academics Edward Herman and Noam Chomsky, who cited Lippmann's advocacy of "manufacture of consent" which referred "to the management of public opinion, which Lippmann felt was necessary for democracy to flourish, since he felt that public opinion was an irrational force."

Notes

External links

 
Open Library. Public Opinion. 1922

1922 non-fiction books
Books about public opinion
Books about the media
Media studies
Books by Walter Lippmann